Ranker may refer to:
 Ranker, a digital media company located in Los Angeles
 Gentleman ranker, an enlisted soldier who may have been a former officer
 Last Ranker, a role-playing video game developed by imageepoch and published by Capcom for the PlayStation
 Rankers, soils developed over non-calcareous material, usually rock
 Kevin Ranker, an American politician who is a member of the Democratic Party
 Ranker, a politician sitting on a committee in which she or he is the senior member of the minority party. Short for "ranking (senior) member"